Runella is a Gram-negative, aerobic and non-motile bacterial genus from the family Spirosomaceae.

References

Further reading 
 
 
 
 

Cytophagia
Bacteria genera